"Party Girls" is a song by American hip hop recording artist Ludacris, featuring vocals from singer Jeremih and rapper Wiz Khalifa, produced by Cashmere Cat. It contains an interpolation of 1997 hit single "Barbie Girl" by Danish-Norwegian dance-pop group Aqua. It was released January 30, 2014 in promotion of his ninth studio album, Ludaversal; this single along with "Rest of My Life" and "Representin" were not included on the album's final track list. The song peaked at number 36 on the Billboard Hot R&B/Hip-Hop Songs chart.

Music video
On March 7, 2014 a music video for the song, directed by Hype Williams, was filmed in Miami. On February 16, 2014 Ludacris posted two clips and a few other pictures from the shooting on his Instagram. A behind-the-scenes video of the video was released on April 28, 2014, and the next day video premiered.

Charts

Release history

References

2014 songs
2014 singles
Ludacris songs
Wiz Khalifa songs
Jeremih songs
Cashmere Cat songs
Def Jam Recordings singles
Songs written by Ludacris
Songs written by Wiz Khalifa
Songs written by Cashmere Cat
Song recordings produced by Cashmere Cat